"Covercraft" is the eighth episode in the twenty-sixth season of the American animated television series The Simpsons, and the 560th episode of the series overall. It first aired on the Fox network in the United States on November 23, 2014.

Plot
Moe and the owner of King Toot's have a fight and are arrested, forcing their businesses to be closed down. Because of this, Homer and Lisa have to buy a saxophone reed from a retail music store. Whilst there, Homer buys a bass guitar and he plays it wherever he is. Annoyed, Marge meets up with other wives in town who also have been annoyed by their husbands' constant playing. They decide to have their husbands form a garage band so they will not always have to listen to their music. Homer gathers Reverend Lovejoy on guitars, Kirk Van Houten on keyboards, and Dr. Hibbert on drums. Apu later joins as the lead singer when they hear him sing "Hopin' for a Dream," a song by the (fictitious) 1980s glam metal band, Sungazer. They call their band Covercraft and start playing shows. At a gig at the Cabbage Festival, Apu admits to Homer that he has stage fright, but Homer suggests that he picture himself alone at the Kwik-E-Mart to cope. The gig is ultimately successful, the band gains recognition and Sungazer sees the video and asks Apu to replace their dead lead singer.

When Homer first sees the success Apu has gotten, he is happy to announce that his friend is becoming rich and successful, until Kirk mentions his jealousy and Apu points out that Sungazer are playing in Las Vegas. When Lisa calls out his jealousy, Homer corrects her, stating he is envious, not jealous, because he wants what someone else has, whereas being jealous is being afraid someone will take what you already have. Lisa quickly looks it up in a dictionary and realizes he is right. Without their lead vocalist, Covercraft's rehearsal sessions grind to a halt when Kirk volunteers to replace Apu and Homer criticizes his vocal abilities. When the others tell Homer to calm down, he angrily breaks up the band.

Marge reminds Homer that he did not start the band to become rich and famous, and encourages him to go to Sungazer's concert in Springfield Costington's arena to show his support for Apu. At the concert, Homer uses a backstage pass to sneak into Apu's dressing room and steal his special Apu shirt, but then overhears the band denying Apu vacation time to spend with his family and mentioning his contract instead. Apu sees Homer and admits that he feels lonely and homesick. Homer decides to take revenge on Sungazer by having Sanjay poison them with Kwik-E-Mart hot dogs. Apu brings out the reunited Covercraft to perform until Homer and Apu are arrested by Chief Wiggum for food poisoning. Sungazer's concert subsequently falters while Sanjay mingles with the groupies.

Production
This episode was originally titled "Band of Dads". Musician Matthew Sweet contributed to this episode's score and wrote a new song.

Reception
The episode received an audience of 3.45 million, making it the most watched show on Fox that night.

Matt Selman was nominated for a Writers Guild of America Award for Outstanding Writing in Animation at the 67th Writers Guild of America Awards for his script to this episode.

References

External links 
 
 "Covercraft" at theSimpsons.com

2014 American television episodes
The Simpsons (season 26) episodes